Summer Shanelle Arjoon (born 6 May 1997), known as Shanelle Arjoon, is a Trinidadian footballer who plays as a forward for the Trinidad and Tobago women's national team.

International career
Arjoon played for Trinidad and Tobago at senior level in the 2018 CFU Women's Challenge Series, the 2018 CONCACAF Women's Championship qualification and the 2020 CONCACAF Women's Olympic Qualifying Championship qualification.

International goals
Scores and results list Trinidad and Tobago' goal tally first.

References

External links

1997 births
Living people
Women's association football forwards
Women's association football midfielders
Women's association football fullbacks
Trinidad and Tobago women's footballers
Trinidad and Tobago women's international footballers
Competitors at the 2014 Central American and Caribbean Games
Competitors at the 2018 Central American and Caribbean Games
College women's soccer players in the United States
Indian Hills Community College alumni
West Texas A&M University alumni
Trinidad and Tobago expatriate women's footballers
Trinidad and Tobago expatriate sportspeople in the United States
Expatriate women's soccer players in the United States